Dar ul-Aala (home of the instrument) is a museum dedicated to traditional Mauro-Andalusi music located in Casablanca, Morocco. It was founded in 2010 by the Society of Amateurs of Andalusi Music in Morocco. It hosts a collection of valuable antique instruments dating back centuries, as well as rare musical recordings, manuscripts, and publications relating to Andalusi music and its legacy.

Gallery

References 

Andalusian music
Buildings and structures in Casablanca
Museums in Morocco